The roles of women in the Arab world have changed throughout history, as the culture and society in which they live has undergone significant transformations. Historically, as well as presently, the situation of women differs greatly between Arabic speaking regions, their urban or rural population and age groups. Among other factors, these differences can be attributed to local traditions, culture and religion, women's social or legal status, their level of education, health or self-awareness. Since the 19th century, and notably through the influence of the colonization in North Africa, the Arab Renaissance in Egypt, Lebanon, and Syria, and the end of the Ottoman Empire, the social and economic changes in the Arab world have become greatly accelerated and diversified.

History of women in the Arab world

Arab women before Islam

Many writers have discussed the status of women in pre-Islamic Arabia, and their findings have been mixed. Under the customary tribal law existing in Arabia at the advent of Islam, women as a general rule had virtually no legal status. They were sold into marriage by their guardians for a certain amount of money, the husband who's the one in control of everything, could terminate the union at will, and women had little or no rights to property or inheritance. On the other hand, other authors have agreed that women's status in pre-Islamic Arabia was poor, citing practices of female infanticide, unlimited polygyny, patrilineal marriage, and others. Saudi historian Hatoon al-Fassi considers much earlier historical origins of Arab women's rights. Using evidence from the ancient Arabian kingdom of Nabataea, she finds that Arab women in Nabataea had independent legal figures. She suggested that they lost many of their rights through ancient Greek and Roman law before the arrival of Islam. Valentine M. Moghadam analyzes the situation of women from a Marxist theoretical framework and argues that the position of women is mostly influenced by the extent of urbanization, industrialization, proletarianization, and political ploys of the state managers rather than culture or intrinsic properties of Islam; Moghadam added that Islam is neither more nor less patriarchal than other world religions especially Christianity and Judaism.

In pre-Islamic Arabia, women's status varied widely according to laws and cultural norms of the tribes to which they belong.  In the prosperous southern region of the Arabian Peninsula, for example, the religious edicts of Christianity and Judaism held sway among the Sabians and Himyarites.  In other places such as the city of Makkah (Mecca) -- where the prophet of Islam, Muhammad, was born—a tribal set of rights was held on place.  This was also true amongst the Bedouin (desert dwellers), and this code varied from tribe to tribe. Thus there was no single definition of the roles played, and rights held, by women prior to the advent of Islam.

In some tribes, women were emancipated even in comparison with many of today's standards. There have been cases where women held high positions of power and authority.

The custom of burying female infants alive, comments a noted Qur'anic commentator, Muhammad Asad, seems to have been fairly widespread in pre-Islamic Arabia. The motives were twofold: the fear that an increase in female offspring would result in economic burden, as well as the fear of the humiliation, frequently caused by girls being captured by a hostile tribe and subsequently preferring their captors to their parents and brothers.

It is generally accepted that Islam changed the structure of Arab society and to a large degree unified the people, reforming and standardizing gender roles throughout the region. According to Islamic studies professor William Montgomery Watt, Islam improved the status of women by "instituting rights of property ownership, inheritance, education and divorce."

The Hadiths in Bukhari suggest that Islam improved women's status, by the second Caliph Umar saying "We never used to give significance to ladies in the days of the Pre-Islamic period of ignorance, but when Islam came and Allah mentioned their rights, we used to give them their rights but did not allow them to interfere in our affairs", Book 77, Hadith 60, 5843, and Vol. 7, Book 72, Hadith 734.

Arab women after Islam

Islam was introduced in the Arabian peninsula in the seventh century, and significantly improved the status of women compared to earlier Arab cultures. According to the Qur'anic decrees, both men and women have the same duties and responsibilities in their worship of God.
As the Qur'an states: "I will not suffer to be lost the work of any of you whether male or female.  You proceed one from another".(Qur'an 3:195)

Islam revolutionized women's role in society unlike any force before, as it uplifted their status in both the public and domestic spheres, and declared them as morally equal in God's view. Islam provided women with rights that men must fulfill upon them, such as the dowry, inheritance, and financial maintenance in divorce, and condemned the practice of female infanticide and abuse. Prophet Muhammad himself stated that the best of men were those that were best to their wives, and in response to a question about whom one should have the best form of companionship with, replied mother thrice before saying father. He also said that those who had three daughters and supported them and showed them mercy was guaranteed Paradise (Al-Albani), and his only form of lineage was through his daughter Fatima. His wife Khadija was also the first to convert to Islam, and was a prominent and wealthy businesswoman of higher economic position than her husband.

Early reforms

The early reforms under Islam in the seventh century, regarding women's rights, have affected marriage, divorce and inheritance. Lindsay Jones says that women were not accorded with such legal status in other cultures, including the West, until centuries later. The Oxford Dictionary of Islam states that the general improvement of the status of Arab women included the prohibition of female infanticide and recognizing women's full personhood. "The dowry, previously regarded as a bride-price paid to the father, became a nuptial gift retained by the wife as part of her personal property." Under Islamic law, marriage was no longer viewed as a "status" but rather as a "contract", in which the woman's consent was imperative. "Women were given inheritance rights in a patriarchal society that had previously restricted inheritance to male relatives." Annemarie Schimmel states that "compared to the pre-Islamic position of women, Islamic legislation meant an enormous progress; the woman has the right, at least according to the letter of the law, to administer the wealth she has brought into the family or has earned by her own work." William Montgomery Watt states that Muhammad, in the historical context of his time, can be seen as a figure who testified on behalf of women's rights and improved things considerably. Watt explains: "At the time Islam began, the conditions of women were terrible - they had no right to own property and were supposed to be their man's property; consequently, if the man died everything went to his sons." Muhammad, however, by "instituting rights of property ownership, inheritance, education, and divorce, gave women certain basic safeguards." Haddad and state that "Muhammad granted women rights and privileges in the sphere of family life, marriage, education, and economic endeavors, which all together help improve women's status in society."

Employment

The labor force in the Arab Caliphate were employed from diverse ethnic and religious backgrounds, while both men and women were involved in diverse occupations and economic activities. Women were employed in a wide range of commercial activities and diverse occupations. Women's economic position was strengthened by the Qur'an, but local custom has weakened that position in their insistence that women must work within the private sector of the world: the home or at least in some sphere related to home. Dr. Nadia Yousaf, an Egyptian sociologist  teaching recently in the United States, stated in a recent article on labor-force participation by women of Middle Eastern and Latin American Countries that the "Middle East reports systematically the lowest female activity rates on record" for labor. This certainly gives the impression that Middle Eastern women have little or no economical role until one notes that the statistics are based on non-agricultural labor outside the home.

In the 12th century, the most famous Islamic philosopher and qadi (judge) Ibn Rushd, known to the West as Averroes, claimed that women were equal to men in all respects and possessed equal capacities to shine in peace and in war, citing examples of female warriors among the Arabs, Greeks and Africans to support his case. In early Muslim history, examples of notable female Muslims who fought during the Muslim conquests and Fitna (civil wars) as soldiers or generals included Nusaybah Bint k’ab Al Maziniyyah, Aisha, Kahula and Wafeira, and Um Umarah.

Sabat M. Islambouli (1867-1941) was one of the first Syrian female physicians. She was a Kurdish Jew from Syria.

International organizations for women in the Arab world 
UN Women, the United Nations agency dedicated to gender equality and the empowerment of women, has a Regional Office for the Arab States (ROAS) in Cairo, Egypt, as well as several country offices covering 17 countries across the Arab States region. According to its mandate, UN Women works to promote gender equality not only as a basic human right, but also for its socio-economic and cultural aims.

ESCWA, the United Nations Economic and Social Commission for Western Asia, publishes Status of Arab Women Reports, providing scientific and current data on a variety of social or economic issues pertaining to women in the Arab world.

Women in the contemporary Arab world

Politics

The first Arab woman head of state is Najla Bouden, who was democratically elected prime minister of Tunisia in 2021. Furthermore, many Arab women, although not head of states themselves, stressed the importance of women in the public sphere, such as the wife of Anwar Sadat in Egypt, and Wassila Bourguiba, the wife of Habib Bourguiba in Tunisia, who have strongly influenced their husbands in dealings the matters of state. Arab countries allow women to vote in national elections. In this regard, the first female Member of Parliament in the Arab world was Rawya Ateya, who was elected in Egypt in 1957. Some countries granted the female franchise in their constitutions following independence, while some extended the franchise to women in later constitutional amendments.

Arab women are under-represented in parliaments in Arab states, although they are gaining more equal representation as Arab states liberalise their political systems. In 2005, the International Parliamentary Union said that 6.5 per cent of MPs in the Arabic-speaking world were women which is somewhat greater than 3.5 per cent in 2000. The contribution of woman in Arab parliament wasn't the same in all Arab countries: in Tunisia for example, nearly 23 per cent of members of parliament were women; however, in Egypt, four per cent female were represented in parliament. For instance, Algeria has the largest female representation in parliament with 32 per cent.

In 2006 in UAE, women stood for election for the first time in the country's history. Although just one female candidate – from Abu Dhabi – was directly elected, the government appointed a further eight women to the 40-seat federal legislature, giving women a 22.5 per cent share of the seats, far higher than the world average of 17.0 per cent.

In the Arab Summit in Tunisia that was held on May 10, 2004, Arab leaders, for the first time, discussed the issue of advancing Arab women as an essential element of the political and economic development of the Arabic-speaking world.

Furthermore, Arab first Ladies have called for greater empowerment of women in the Arab World so that females could stand in an approximate equal position as males.

The role of women in politics in Arab societies is largely determined by the will of these countries' leaderships to support female representation and cultural attitudes towards women's involvement in public life. Dr Rola Dashti, a female candidate in Kuwait's 2006 parliamentary elections, claimed that "the negative cultural and media attitude towards women in politics" was one of the main reasons why no women were elected. She also pointed to "ideological differences", with conservatives and extremist Islamists opposing female participation in political life and discouraging women from voting for a woman. She also cited malicious gossip, attacks on the banners and publications of female candidates, lack of training, and corruption as barriers to electing female MPs. In contrast, one of UAE's female MPs, Najla al Awadhi, claimed that "women's advancement is a national issue and we have a leadership that understands that and wants them to have their rights."

Lebanon in 2019 elected its first female interior of state minister, becoming the first woman to hold this important position.

The poor representation and solutions 

In Jordan, Princess Basma Bint Talal initiated the establishment of the Jordanian National Commission for Women (JNCW) in 1992. The Commission being highest policy-making institute in Jordan, it tackled on women's political, legislative, economic, social, educational, and health rights and issues.

In Lebanon, the Convention on the Elimination of all forms of Discrimination Against Women (CEDAW), is striving to eliminate laws, traditions, and customs that are intended to or otherwise result in gender-based discrimination.

The Women's Learning Partnership (WLP) in Morocco proposed a national plan to integrate women into the country's economic development — the Plan d’action National pour l’integration de la Femme au Development (PANDIF).

Lastly in Saudi Arabia, the Nahda Charitable Society for Women seeks the empowerment of women within the framework of Islamic law.

The woman in the Arab countries has the lowest participation in politics in the world, and if she gains a chance for a high position, the soft issues such as social affairs and women's issues are mostly her only choices. This is mostly due to the inherent social patriarchal attributes and the stereotype of the women in this region. This absence in politics poses many problems, such as loss of gender rights, and could increase the social inequalities and thus weakens the quality of life, which are represented in several factors such as poor health, education, economy, and the environment. Some studies confirmed the importance and transformational role that women's quotas provide to women in Arab countries. Yet, working to change the stereotype image of Arab women through official and social media, is one of the proposed solutions to achieve a positive increase in women's political representation in the Arabic-speaking world.

Active and passive suffrage for women

Women were granted the right to vote on a universal and equal basis in Lebanon in 1952, Syria (to vote) in 1949 (Restrictions or conditions lifted) in 1953, Egypt in 1956,
Tunisia in 1959, Mauritania in 1961, Algeria in 1962, Morocco in 1963, Libya and  Sudan in 1964, Yemen in 1967  (full right) in 1970, Bahrain in 1973, Jordan in 1974, Iraq (full right) 1980, Kuwait in 1985 (later removed and re-granted in 2005),Oman in 1994, and Saudi Arabia in 2015.

Economic role
According to a report from UNESCO, 34-57% of STEM grads in Arab countries are women, which is much higher than in the universities of the US or Europe.

A growing number of firms owned by females started to hire women in executive positions. In fact, in Jordan, Palestine, Saudi Arabia and Egypt, firms run by women are growing their workforces at higher rates than those run by men.

In some of the wealthier Arab countries such as UAE, the number of women business owners is growing rapidly and adding to the economic development of the country. Many of these women work with family businesses and are encouraged to study and work. Arab women are estimated to have $40 billion of personal wealth at their disposal, with Qatari families being among the richest in the world.

However, 13 of the 15 countries with the lowest rates of women participating in their labor force are in the Middle East and North Africa. Yemen has the lowest rate of working women of all, followed by Syria, Jordan, Iran, Morocco, Saudi Arabia, Algeria, Lebanon, Egypt, Oman, Tunisia, Mauritania, and Turkey. Unemployment among women in the Middle East is twice that of men, pointing to low wages, a lack of skills and a belief among some that a woman's place is in the home.

Gender inequality remains a major concern in the region, which has the lowest female economic participation in the world (27% of females in the region participate in the workforce, compared to a global average of 56%).

In Saudi Arabia, women do better than men in science and math. In Iran, research shows that girls have “caught up with boys, reversing their score gap, between 1999 and 2007, in both math and science.” And Jordan has always been a top performer in education, with girls outperforming boys there for decades but women still do not get jobs.

There are three reasons that hold women back from the labor force. First, the socio-economic environment discourages women from working despite encouraging them to get an education, especially in oil-rich Gulf nations. Oil and oil-related revenues perpetuate patriarchal family structures because the state itself is the “patriarch” of its citizens, employing them and providing them with ready income. This means that citizens don't have to look for ways to make money outside of state patronage, and may just reinforce already existing conservative gender roles where women stay at home. Oil and oil-related revenues also structure the economy away from female-intensive sectors. Secondly, patriarchal state institution systems often means weak, dependent private sectors that do not want to or can not afford to assume the cost of women's reproductive roles. This seriously hinders women's practical and logistical participation in the labor force. Thirdly, the inhospitable business environment in the private sector discourages women to work. No Arab country has a legal quota for the percentage of women it must include on corporate boards. Only Morocco and Djibouti have laws against gender discrimination in hiring and for equal remuneration for equal work. Algeria has also ruled in favor of equal pay for equal work.

Women could contribute to the country's economy since women's employment can significantly improve household income—by as much as 25 percent—and lead many families out of poverty. It continues that increased household income will not only positively impact MENA economies on the micro-level, but it will bolster economies on the macro level as well.

Education

The Muslim community is often criticized for not providing an equal opportunity for education for females. According to an analytical study on women's education in the Muslim world, it shows that a country's wealth – not its laws or culture – is the most important factor in determining a woman's educational fate. Women in oil-rich Gulf countries have made some of the biggest educational leaps in recent decades. Compared to women in oil-rich Saudi Arabia, young Muslim women in Mali have shown significantly fewer years of schooling.

In Arab countries, the first modern schools were opened in Egypt (1829), Lebanon (1835) and Iraq (1898).

Female education rapidly increased after emancipation from foreign domination around 1977. Before that, the illiteracy rate remained high among Arab women.  The gap between female and male enrollment varies across the Arab world. Countries like Bahrain, Jordan, Kuwait, Libya, Lebanon, Qatar, and the United Arab Emirates achieved almost equal enrollment rates between girls and boys. Female enrollment was as low as 10% in North of Yemen back in 1975. In Unesco's 2012 annual report, it predicted that Yemen won't achieve gender equality in education before 2025. In Qatar, the first school was built in 1956 after a fatwa that states that the Qur'an did not forbid female education.

Over the time period of 1960–1975, the female enrollment ratio in elementary schools grew from 27.9 to 46, 10 to 24.2 for secondary schools.

In terms of college education, in Tunisia, the enrollment jumped from 1,020 people in 1965 to 6,070 in 1977. In Iraq, from 7,625 in 1965 to 28,267 in 1975, in Lebanon from 3,685 in 1965 to I 1,000 in 1971, in Algeria from 1,642 in 1965 to 12,171 in 1975, and in Morocco from 1,089 in 1965 to 8,440 in 1975.

Education attainment has risen drastically among many Arab countries but in this case strictly speaking about Egypt. The type of quality of the education attained is a different issue as there is still a gap in connecting the curriculum and career specific skills. Not just that but the access to higher quality education can be limited by social class and wealth.  The quality of the education is determined by the kind of foreign languages available, the depth of the topics studied and the credentials of the teachers and professor. That results in large gaps between social classes and gender equality regarding education attainment.

Travel
Women have varying degrees of difficulty moving freely in Arab countries. A couple of nations prohibit women from ever traveling alone, while in others, women can travel freely but experience a greater risk of sexual harassment or assault than they would in Western countries.

Women have the right to drive in all Arab countries with Saudi Arabia lifting the ban on June 24, 2018. In Jordan, travel restrictions on women were lifted in 2003. "Jordanian law provides citizens the right to travel freely within the country and abroad except in designated military areas. Unlike Jordan's previous law (No. 2 of 1969), the current Provisional Passport Law (No. 5 of 2003) does not require women to seek permission from their male guardians or husbands in order to renew or obtain a passport." In Yemen, women must obtain approval from a husband or father to get an exit visa to leave the country, and a woman may not take her children with her without their father's permission, regardless of whether or not the father has custody. The ability of women to travel or move freely within Saudi Arabia is severely restricted. However, in 2008 a new law went into effect requiring men who marry non-Saudi women to allow their wife and any children born to her to travel freely in and out of Saudi Arabia. In Saudi Arabia, women must travel with their guardians permission and they are not supposed to talk to strange random men, even if their lives are in danger.

In the past, women in Islamic culture were strictly forbidden to travel around without a male chaperone. Today, to some degree, it is permissible, and there is no objection to a woman traveling alone by the various safe routes and means of travel via their venues such as airports, harbors, and safe transportations. As long as a woman's safety is ensured during her trip, the prohibition is lifted.

Traditional dress

 
Adherence to traditional dress varies across Arab societies. Saudi Arabia is more traditional, while countries like Egypt, and Lebanon are less so. Women are required by law to wear abayas in only Saudi Arabia; this is enforced by the religious police. Some allege that this restricts their economic participation and other activities. In most countries, like Bahrain, Kuwait, Lebanon, Libya, Oman, Jordan, Syria and Egypt, the veil is not mandatory. The veil, hijab in Arabic, means anything that hides.

In Tunisia, the secular government has banned the use of the veil in its opposition to religious extremism. Former President Zine El Abidine Ben Ali called the veil sectarian and foreign and has stressed the importance of traditional Tunisian dress as a symbol of national identity.  Islamic feminism counters both sorts of externally imposed dress codes.

Religious views differ on what is considered the proper hijab. This explains the variation in Islamic attire according to geographic location.

Conflation of Muslim and Arab identity 
"Arab" and "Muslim" are often used interchangeably. The conflation of these two identities ignores the diverse religious beliefs of Arab people and also overlooks Muslims who are not Arabs. It, "also erases the historic and vast ethnic communities who are neither Arab nor Muslim but who live amid and interact with a majority of Arabs or Muslims."  This generalization, "enables the construction of Arabs and Muslims as backward, barbaric, misogynist, sexually savage, and sexually repressive." This type of stereotyping leads to the orientalizing of Arab women and depicts them as fragile, sexually oppressed individuals who cannot stand up for their beliefs. It is also significant that countless female figures overcame oppression and proved dominant in their field, including Zaha Hadid, Hayat Sindi and Lubna Olayan.

Arab women's rights and legal restrictions 
Tunisia is the only Arabic-speaking Muslim-majority country to grant women equal rights as men, outlawing polygamy, allowing Muslim women to marry non-Muslim men, and giving them equal inheritance as men.

Egypt is one of the leading countries with active feminist movements, and the fight for women's rights is  associated to social justice and secular nationalism. Egyptian feminism started out with informal networks of activism after women were not granted the same rights as their male comrades in 1922. The movements eventually resulted in women gaining the right to vote in 1956.

Although Lebanese laws don't give Lebanese women full rights, Lebanon has a very large feminism movement. NGOs like Kafa and Abaad have served this feminist obligation, and tried several times to pass adequate laws that give Lebanese women their rights. The most talked about right is citizenship by marriage and descent: a woman in Lebanon is not authorised to pass her citizenship to her spouse nor her children. This right is making a buzz in Lebanese society, but isn't widely approved.

Feminists in Saudi Arabia can end up in jail or face a death penalty for their activism. Some of their requests were granted such as not requiring a male guardian to access government services. Women still need a male guardian's approval to travel and marry.

In Libya, a rather conservative Arab country, Khadija Bsekri, a professor, founded in 2011 an organisation, The Female Amazons of Libya. The organisation launched some campaigns, such as those to curtail against violence against women, improve the status of migrant shelters, and strengthen the capacities of activists and media professionals. Its name reflects mythical prehistoric Libyan Amazons.

To continue female empowerment in the Arabic-speaking world, young Arab women need role models. A lot of the times, these role models can be found through social media.

Some atheist, women's rights supporters, such as Egyptian activist Sherif Gaber, argue that most of the hostile attitudes towards women in Muslim male culture such as over-sexual/pure-virgin view of women, and hostile actions such as marriage to preteen girls, physical assault by male relatives, marital rape, infidelity by polygamy, sexual harassment or assault, and forced obedience to a Wali are due to Islam as a religion literally in accordance with its male-dominant spirit. This is apparent in Muslim majority countries. He compares in the west that women are more protected against violence, including sexual violence than in the Arab countries. This view is not popular in the Arab world as Muslims believe in Islamic sharia law as the non-negotiable word of their God, regardless of the moral dilemma of the Islamic religion and physical or psychological impact on women and children.

Prominent Arab women 
In 2018, Arabian Business ranked the "50 Most Influential Women in the Arab World" as:

Forbes Middle East published a "Most Influential Women 2018" list, naming the top 10 Arabian women of societal influence as:

Lama Al-Sulaiman 
Lama Al-Sulaiman was one of the first two Saudi women elected office as a board member of the Jeddah Chamber of Commerce (JCC), a prominent center for businesswomen in Saudi Arabia, and is now president of its Khadijah bint Khuwalid Center for Businesswomen. The World Economic Forum recognized her as a Young Arab Leader, and she has been the director of Rolaco Trading and Contracting, the National Institute of Health Services, the National Home Health Care Foundation, and the Economic and Social Circle of the Mecca Region. Al-Sulaiman earned a BSc in Biochemistry from King Abdulaziz University in Saudi Arabia, and holds an M.Sc. in health and nutrition and a PhD in biochemical nutrition from King's College at the University of London. Just a week before standing at the JCC election, Ms. Al-Sulaiman won a deadly struggle against breast cancer. At the Sixth Cancer Cure Conference she shared her remarkable story of recovery publicly for the first time. She realized that the best treatment was closeness to God. She followed the appropriate nutritional plan and used alternative medicine to improve physically.

Christine Sfeir 
Christine Sfeir was only 22 years old when she moved to Beirut from Montreal, Canada, and opened the first Dunkin' Donuts in Lebanon. Christine is ranked as one of the top 100 Arab Women, and she is also the CEO of Lebanese food chains Semsom and Green Falafel. Since 1997, when Christine opened the first Dunkin Donuts in Lebanon, she has opened more than 30 DD restaurants in the country. She has furthermore expanded her talent in restaurant chains, and on top of being the CEO of the Dunkin' Donuts chain in Lebanon, she is bringing Lebanese cuisine to the United States with the restaurant chain Semsom, and has future plans of opening up in India⁣.

Mona Almoayyed 

Mona Yousuf Almoayyed is a businesswoman, philanthropist, environmentalist and women's rights activist who is the managing director of one of Bahrain's oldest conglomerates, Y. K. Almoayyed & Sons.

A Bachelor of Business Administration, Mona has been instrumental in overseeing the business endeavours of Y. K. Almoayyed & Sons, leading it meticulously towards its desired destination.

Voted the third most influential Arab Women's List in the MENA region by Forbes Middle East in 2013, and in 2018, Mona is a member of the board of directors for BMMI and Ebda Bank besides other companies. She is well known for her charity work and frequently speaks about the role of women in building a better society today. Mona has been a firm believer of 'Business with a Conscience' principle and is involved in many charitable institutions. Besides her Business and Social Activity, Mona strives to draw a perfect balance between being a mother, housewife and mentor role she plays.

Having been brought up in a conservative environment in the 70s Middle East, the young girl's childhood was simple and disciplined like any middle class Arab girl's upbringing.

Mona Bawarshi 
Mona Bawarshi is CEO of Gezairi and an active philanthropist committed to seeing Lebanon and the Arab world prosper. Through her impeccable professional recor—she has even been listed among the Most Influential Arab Women by Forbes—and her work with various organisations, she promotes education and ethics as tools for a better future.

Donna Sultan 
For 36 years, Donna Sultan has played a significant role in positioning KEO International Consultants within the market. During the past 28 years, she has served as the president and chief executive officer of the planning, design, engineering, and project management specialist. Based out of Kuwait, Sultan led a team of 686 full-time qualified engineers in 2018. Her team currently includes a total of 291 female employees.

Some of the group's training initiatives in 2018 revolved around contract awareness and standard operating procedures. One of KEO International Consultants’ initiatives this year centres on financial commercial management and enterprise resource planning.

Ismahane Elouafi 

Dr. Ismahane Elouafi is the chief scientist of the Food and Agriculture Organization of the United Nations (FAO), since 2020. She joined ICBA as Director General in 2012 and, prior, held management positions with the Canadian Food Inspection Agency and Agriculture and Agri-Food Canada. She also worked as a scientist with several international research organizations, including the International Center for Agricultural Research in the Dry Areas (ICARDA), Japan International Research Center for Agricultural Sciences (JIRCAS), and International Maize and Wheat Center (CIMMYT).

She is a recipient of many international awards, including the Excellence in Science award from the Global Thinkers Forum (2014), and the National Reward Medal by His Majesty Mohamed VI, the King of Morocco (2014). In 2014, Muslim Science ranked Dr. Elouafi among the 20 Most Influential Women in Science in the Islamic World under the Shapers category, and the CEO-Middle East Magazine listed her among the World's 100 Most Powerful Arab Women in the Science category.

Buthaina Al Ansari 
Buthaina Al Ansari, founder and Chairperson of Qatariat T&D Holding Company and Senior Human Resources Director at Ooredoo, delivered a CIRS Monthly Dialogue on the topic of “Sheroes—How Female Leaders are Changing Qatar” on November 17, 2014.

Al Ansari is a member of the MENA Business Women's Networks, an ambassador for Women Leading Change Qatar, a board member of Qatar Business Women's Association, and a Mentor at the Qatar Professional Women's Network Circle.

Abeer Abu Ghaith 

Abeer Abu Ghaith is a technology entrepreneur from Palestine. She has been celebrated as Palestine's first female high-tech entrepreneur. Abu Ghaith is known as a trailblazer for women and young people in the Middle East; an entrepreneur; and an international businesswoman before the age of 30. Abu Ghaith grew up in a Palestinian refugee camp in Jordan. Abu Ghaith uses modern technology to provide jobs to young women and men who live and work in fragile territories like Gaza.

Abu Ghaith is the founder and CEO of MENA Alliances Group Inc., an international business aimed at providing high-quality and value outsourced business and technology solutions faster, easier, trusted, and fully localized while creating economic opportunity for talent in the MENA region. Her company has been selected as “Best social impact company” in Metkite competition in Italy. MENA Alliances is an expansion of Abeer's previous business “StayLinked”.

See also

Arab culture
Democracy in the Middle East
Human rights in the Middle East
Human trafficking in the Middle East
LGBT in the Middle East
Sexual taboo in the Middle East
Al-Khansa
Al-Khayzuran
Arab Christians
Arab Jews
Campaign Against Lebanese Rape Law - Article 522
Egyptian Feminist Union
Female genital cutting
Gender apartheid
Negev Bedouin women
Rania al-Baz
Saddeka Arebi
Sahrawi women
Shajarat al-Durr
Women and Memory Forum
Women in Muslim societies
Women's political rights in Bahrain
Duma (2011 film)
Women's rights in Saudi Arabia

References

.
A
Arab
Arab
.
A
A
A